Huang Hsiu-fang (born 10 November 1971) is a Taiwanese politician.

She was elected to the Legislative Yuan in 2016. In June 2022, Huang received the DPP nomination for the Changhua County magistracy.

References

1971 births
Living people
Changhua County Members of the Legislative Yuan
Members of the 9th Legislative Yuan
Democratic Progressive Party Members of the Legislative Yuan
21st-century Taiwanese women politicians
Members of the 10th Legislative Yuan